Darnsee is a  deep lake in Bramsche, Lower Saxony, Germany.

References

Lakes of Lower Saxony